The European Journal of English Studies is a peer-reviewed academic journal focusing on English language, literature and culture, established in 1997 and published by Routledge. It is the official journal of the European Society for the Study of English. The current editors-in-chief are Greta Olson, Katerina Kitsi-Mitakou, Isabela Carrera Suárez, and Frederik van Dam. The journal appears three times a year and the individual issues are devoted to specific topics, e.g.:
 Letters and letter writing
 New Englishes
 Intercultural negotiations
The aim of the journal is to reflect the multicultural perspective characterising the current state of English studies research in Europe, while encouraging dialogue and not avoiding controversial topics.

References

External links 
 

Literary magazines published in the United Kingdom
Linguistics journals
Publications established in 1997
English-language journals
Taylor & Francis academic journals
Triannual journals
Academic journals associated with international learned and professional societies of Europe